In six-dimensional Euclidean geometry, the omnitruncated 6-simplex honeycomb is a space-filling tessellation (or honeycomb). It is composed entirely of omnitruncated 6-simplex facets.

The facets of all  omnitruncated simplectic honeycombs are called permutahedra and can be positioned in n+1 space with integral coordinates, permutations of the whole numbers (0,1,..,n).

A lattice 

The A lattice (also called A) is the union of seven A6 lattices, and has the vertex arrangement of the dual to the omnitruncated 6-simplex honeycomb, and therefore the Voronoi cell of this lattice is the omnitruncated 6-simplex.

 ∪ 
 ∪ 
 ∪ 
 ∪ 
 ∪ 
 ∪ 
 = dual of

Related polytopes and honeycombs

See also
Regular and uniform honeycombs in 6-space:
6-cubic honeycomb
6-demicubic honeycomb
6-simplex honeycomb
Truncated 6-simplex honeycomb
222 honeycomb

Notes

References 
 Norman Johnson Uniform Polytopes, Manuscript (1991)
 Kaleidoscopes: Selected Writings of H.S.M. Coxeter, edited by F. Arthur Sherk, Peter McMullen, Anthony C. Thompson, Asia Ivic Weiss, Wiley-Interscience Publication, 1995,  
 (Paper 22) H.S.M. Coxeter, Regular and Semi Regular Polytopes I, [Math. Zeit. 46 (1940) 380-407, MR 2,10] (1.9 Uniform space-fillings)
 (Paper 24) H.S.M. Coxeter, Regular and Semi-Regular Polytopes III, [Math. Zeit. 200 (1988) 3-45]

Honeycombs (geometry)
7-polytopes